Limnonectes fragilis (common names: fragile large-headed frog, fragile wart frog) is a species of frog in the family Dicroglossidae. It is endemic to the Hainan Island, China. It is a medium-sized frog, males being  and females  snout-vent length. Its natural habitats are subtropical or tropical moist lowland forest and rivers. It is threatened by habitat loss.

References

fragilis
Frogs of China
Endemic fauna of Hainan
Taxonomy articles created by Polbot
Amphibians described in 1973